Breed is a town in Oconto County, Wisconsin, United States. The population was 657 at the 2000 census. The unincorporated communities of Breed and Logan are located in the town.

History
A post office called Breed was established in 1888, and remained in operation until it was discontinued in 1966. The community was named for its first postmaster, George M. Breed.

Geography

According to the United States Census Bureau, the town has a total area of 35.8 square miles (92.6 km2), of which, 35.5 square miles (92.1 km2) of it is land and 0.2 square miles (0.6 km2) of it (0.64%) is water. The latitude of Breed is 45.073N and the longitude is −88.424W. Breed sits at the elevation of 902 feet.

Demographics
As of the census of 2000, there were 657 people, 268 households, and 195 families residing in the town. The population density was 18.5 people per square mile (7.1/km2). There were 322 housing units at an average density of 9.1 per square mile (3.5/km2). The racial makeup of the town was 97.26% White, 0.15% African American, 1.07% Native American, 0.15% Asian, and 1.37% from two or more races.

There were 268 households, out of which 26.9% had children under the age of 18 living with them, 64.9% were married couples living together, 4.1% had a female householder with no husband present, and 27.2% were non-families. 22.8% of all households were made up of individuals, and 9.7% had someone living alone who was 65 years of age or older. The average household size was 2.45 and the average family size was 2.90.

In the town, the population was spread out, with 24.4% under the age of 18, 4.1% from 18 to 24, 25.1% from 25 to 44, 27.7% from 45 to 64, and 18.7% who were 65 years of age or older. The median age was 43 years. For every 100 females, there were 101.5 males. For every 100 females age 18 and over, there were 105.4 males.

The median income for a household in the town was $36,103, and the median income for a family was $40,469. Males had a median income of $31,875 versus $25,750 for females. The per capita income for the town was $18,704. About 3.8% of families and 6.9% of the population were below the poverty line, including 10.2% of those under age 18 and 1.5% of those age 65 or over.

References

Towns in Oconto County, Wisconsin
Green Bay metropolitan area
Towns in Wisconsin